Amos Kollek (born September 15, 1947) is an Israeli film director, writer and actor.

Biography
Amos Kollek was born in Jerusalem. He is the son of Teddy Kollek, the long-time mayor of Jerusalem. Kollek studied psychology and philosophy at the Hebrew University of Jerusalem. He became interested in film after working as a writer. He produced his first film, Goodbye, New York, in 1985. His film Fast Food Fast Women was entered into the 2000 Cannes Film Festival.

Filmography

Books (incomplete)
Don't Ask Me If I Love (1971)
After They Hang Him (1977)
Tishali Im Ani Ohev [script for Barbara Noble Tishali Im Ani Ohev ("Worlds Apart") movie] (1980)
Ha-Tapuah, ha-shir, veha-zahav (1980)
Ein Leben für Jerusalem (1992)
Approximately Clint Eastwood (1995)
Es geschah in Gaza (1996)

References

External links

1947 births
Living people
People from Jerusalem
Israeli Jews
Israeli people of Hungarian-Jewish descent
Israeli film directors
Israeli male film actors
Hebrew University of Jerusalem alumni